The Wing D-1 Derringer is an American light twin-engined two-seat monoplane tourer designed by John Thorp and developed by the Hi-Shear Corporation and built by the Wing Aircraft Company.

Development
The D-1 Derringer light twin design was originally designed in 1958 by John Thorp as the Thorp T-17 a twin-engined development of his Thorp T-11 Sky Scooter. The design was taken over by George Wing of the Hi-Shear Corporation. The Derringer is a low-wing cantilever monoplane with a retractable tricycle landing gear. It had room for two in an enclosed cockpit with an unusual up and backward opening canopy. It was powered by two 100 hp Continental O-200 engines, one mounted on the leading edge of each wing. The prototype aircraft (registered N3621G) first flew on May 1, 1962 at Torrance.

A second prototype flew in November 1964 but crashed a few weeks later due to an in-flight airframe failure. A static test aircraft and two more aircraft were built for testing which resulted in the award of FAA type certificate A9WE on December 20, 1966. The aircraft did not go into production due to internal problems within the Hi-Shear Corporation.

The Derringer used manufacturing techniques that were considered new at the time it was developed.  Butt-joined, flush-riveted, chemically-milled and stretched skins are used throughout the airframe.

Development of a two-seat Coin/military trainer version designated Wing D-2M Derringer was begun but failed to develop further than the design stage.

In 1978 George Wing left Hi-Shear and started the Wing Aircraft Company. The company built one-pre-production aircraft followed by six production aircraft, entering bankruptcy in July 1982, after which only one further aircraft was built before seven unfinished airframes were sold.

As of June 3, 1998, the D-1’s type certificate number A9WE was held by Emerald Enterprises LTD of San Diego, CA. 

Nine D-1 aircraft were on the U.S. civil aircraft register in May 2009.

Specifications (D-1)

See also

References

 

 

1960s United States civil utility aircraft
Low-wing aircraft
Aircraft first flown in 1962
Twin piston-engined tractor aircraft